This table displays the top-rated primetime television series of the 1957–58 season as measured by Nielsen Media Research.

References

1957 in American television
1958 in American television
1957-related lists
1958-related lists
Lists of American television series